Bonnie Timmermann (born Bonnie J. Golub, December 1947) is an American casting director and producer for film, television and theatre, perhaps best known for her work on the TV series Miami Vice and for her ongoing collaboration with the show's creator, Michael Mann.

Early life and career
Timmermann was born Bonnie J. Golub in Manhattan, New York City, one of three children born to Joseph Golub and Bertha Teruer. Raised near Rockaway Beach, Queens, Golub left home at age 16 and—much to her subsequent regret—never did finish high school.

In the 1970s, she worked at the William Morris Agency and Helen Harvey Associates before opening her own agency, Bonnie Golub Associates, in 1974. It was roughly 3 years later that Golub acquired, via marriage, the surname by which she has since come to be universally known. The marriage itself, however, proved short-lived, and in 1983 Timmermann met—and promptly married—her current husband and occasion collaborator, John A. Connor, one of whose two writing credits is on a Timmermann-cast TV episode of Miami Vice. 

On March 17, 1992, Timmermann made her Broadway producing debut with Ariel Dorfman's Death and the Maiden; she later served as co-producer on Roman Polanski's screen adaptation.

On September 8, 2022, Bonnie, Simon Wallon's documentary on Timmermann's life and career, received its world premiere at the Venice Biennale.

Partial filmography

 Uncommon Women and Others, 1978
 The House of Mirth, 1981 
 Fast Times at Ridgemont High, 1982
 Trading Places, 1983
 Easy Money, 1983
 The Keep, 1983 (Casting [USA])
 C.H.U.D., 1984
 Amadeus, 1984 (Casting [Additional])
 Miami Vice (89 episodes), 1985–1989 
 Band of the Hand, 1986
 Crime Story (pilot), 1986
 Manhunter, 1986
 Tough Guys Don't Dance, 1987 (New York casting)
 Gardens of Stone, 1987 (East Coast casting)
 Dirty Dancing, 1987
 Beverly Hills Cop II, 1987
 Light of Day, 1987
 Ironweed, 1987
 Frantic, 1988 (Casting [USA])
 Midnight Run, 1988
 Miles from Home, 1988
 Stealing Home, 1988
 Tequila Sunrise, 1988
 Bull Durham, 1988
 The Salute of the Jugger, 1989 (Casting [USA])
 Revenge, 1989
 Johnny Handsome
 Awakenings, 1990
 State of Grace, 1990
 Mobsters, 1991
 The Hard Way, 1991
 Dragon: The Bruce Lee Story, 1992 (The Filmmakers would like to thank)
 Medicine Man, 1992
 Bitter Moon, 1992 (Casting [USA])
 The Last of the Mohicans
 Glengarry Glen Ross, 1992
 Dave, 1993
 Carlito's Way, 1993
 Point of No Return, 1993
 The Music of Chance, 1993
 I Love Trouble, 1994
 Quiz Show, 1994
 Romeo is Bleeding, 1994
 Heat, 1995
 Death and the Maiden, 1995 (Co-producer)
 Eraser, 1996
 City of Industry, 1996 (Consultant)
 Father's Day, 1997
 A Further Gesture, 1997 (Co-producer, casting [US])
 In the Gloaming, 1997 (Co-producer, casting )
 Six Days Seven Nights, 1998
 Armageddon, 1998
 The Insider, 1999
 Coyote Ugly, 2000
 Blue Moon, 2000
 Once in the Life , 2000
 Chinese Coffee, 2001
 Spy Game, 2001
 Pearl Harbor, 2001
 An American Rhapsody, 2001 (Producer)
 Black Hawk Down, 2002
 The Guys (Executive Producer)
 Wonderful Days (Special Thanks to)
 Shade
 Man on Fire, 2004
 Cuba Libre, 2004
 Slow Burn, 2005
 Bug, 2006
 Fur: An Imaginary Portrait of Diane Arbus, 2006
 Deception, 2008
 The Broken, 2009 (Casting Director [US])
 Public Enemies, 2009
 The Conspirator, 2010 (Casting Consultant)
 Small Apartments, 2013
 I Origins, 2014 (Executive Producer)
 Blackhat, 2015
 Ballerina, 2016
 Holy Lands, 2017
 Remember Me, 2019 (Casting Director)
 I Know This Much Is True (Season 1), 2019–2020 (Casting)

Personal life
Timmermann's brother Devin Golub is a sound recordist and mixer in television and film.

Notes

References

Further reading
 Geller, Lynn (March 14, 1986). "She Helps Clients Book Very 'Vice' Spots; Bonnie Timmermann gives 'Miami Vice' leads competition by booking eccentric guest stars; Miami Vice' Guest List Features Famous Names". The Tampa Tribune. pp. 1D, 4D. (This is, perhaps, a slightly revised—and/or re-illustrated—version of Geller's "Looking for Mr. Guest Spot", published in the 2/10/86 issue of US.)
 Morgan, Spencer (November 14, 2007). "Sozzled Actor Mickey Rourke—That Punk!". The New York Observer.
 Smith Liz (April 17, 2009). "A True Tale of Luck, Talent and Ambition". The Stuart News. p. 2.
 Brunner, Jeryl (January 28, 2018). "How Casting Director/Producer Bonnie Timmermann Nurtured The Careers Of Saoirse Ronan And Many More". Forbes.

External links
 
 
 
 Bonnie Timmerman interview at Big Think

1947 births
Living people
People from Manhattan
People from Rockaway, Queens
Film producers from New York (state)
American casting directors
Women casting directors
Businesspeople from New York City
American talent agents